WJKE (101.3 FM, "K-Love") is a contemporary Christian music radio station licensed to Stillwater, New York, United States, and serving Saratoga County as an affiliate of the K-Love network. It is owned by the Educational Media Foundation and broadcasts at 2,900 watts ERP from a tower in Stillwater. In addition to its key coverage area, WJKE is a rimshot into both the Glens Falls/Lake George area and the tri-cities of Albany, Schenectady and Troy.

The station previously aired a mainstream AC format, with an emphasis on gold-based soft and upbeat music from the 80s and 90s, along with some currents with the on air branding "Star 101.3".

The station debuted an adult CHR format in February 2013, along with the return of The Jockey branding, the station utilize that branding during the early years of AC (1988-1994).

The station began broadcasting in 1988 as WSSV, a full-service adult contemporary station that served mainly the nearby city of Saratoga Springs. Sold by its original owners in April 1994, the station reimaged itself as WJKE (The Jockey), a name referring to the nearby Saratoga Race Course. When WJKE became the first station bought by the Anastos Media Group in October 1998, the station was rebranded again with the WQAR (Star 101.3) calls and name.

Ernie Anastos sold his Albany-area stations—WQAR, WABY, WUAM and its translator W291BY, and WVKZ—to Empire Broadcasting Corporation in June 2012 at a purchase price of $1.2 million. The transaction was consummated on September 7, 2012. On September 8, 2012, the station reverted to the WJKE call sign. On February 27, 2013, WJKE rebranded as "The Jockey".

WJKE previously aired several nationally syndicated radio shows including "Intelligence For Your Life" with John Tesh, Your Weekend with Jim Brickman, and "Retro Pop Reunion" with Joe Cortez. The station no longer carries these programs as of 2013.

On November 15, 2017, Empire Broadcasting sold WJKE to Educational Media Foundation for $550,000. EMF flipped the station to its K-Love network upon the sale's closure on February 1, 2018. The signal was paired with WYKV, as its coverage contour nearly ends where WJKE's begins.

References

External links

JKE
Contemporary Christian radio stations in the United States
K-Love radio stations
Radio stations established in 1988
1988 establishments in New York (state)
JKE
Educational Media Foundation radio stations